Jedok geom or Admiral sword or Commander sword is a sword-skill originating from China and used during the Japanese invasions of Korea during the 16th century. 

The techniques required the use of both a sharp sword and a waist sword. The Chinese used straight-bladed swords (jikdo) with a single edge for slashing and a double-edged sword (geom) for stabbing. The techniques, with 14 basic stances, were first published in the Muyesinbo, a martial arts manual from the Joseon Dynasty.

See also
Korean sword

Traditional Korean weapons
Korean_swords